The 1876 Liskeard by-election was fought on 22 December 1876.  The byelection was fought due to the death of the incumbent Liberal MP, Edward Horsman.  It was won by the Liberal candidate Leonard Courtney.

References

1876 in England
1876 elections in the United Kingdom
By-elections to the Parliament of the United Kingdom in Cornish constituencies
19th century in Cornwall
December 1876 events
Liskeard